The 2001 NBA playoffs was the postseason tournament of the National Basketball Association's 2000-01 season. The tournament concluded with the Western Conference champion Los Angeles Lakers defeating the Eastern Conference champion Philadelphia 76ers 4 games to 1. Shaquille O'Neal was named NBA Finals MVP for the second straight year.

Overview  
The Dallas Mavericks made the playoffs for the first time since 1990. Along the way they had many abysmal seasons, including back-to-back years with 11 and 13 wins.

The Los Angeles Lakers entered the postseason with an eight game winning streak, while the Milwaukee Bucks entered the playoffs as division champions for the first time since 1986.

For the first time since 1997, all four late 80’s expansion teams (Miami, Orlando, Charlotte, and Minnesota) made the playoffs. As of 2023, this remains the most recent occurrence of all four expansion teams making the playoffs.

With their series win over the Orlando Magic, the Milwaukee Bucks won their first playoff series since 1989.

With their 3-2 series win over the Utah Jazz in the first round, the Dallas Mavericks won their first playoff series since 1988. This also marked the first time since 1995 that the Jazz failed to advance past the first round.

The Sacramento Kings won their first playoff series since 1981 (when they were the Kansas City Kings) and the first since moving to Sacramento. The Toronto Raptors also won their first playoff series in franchise history with their 3–2 first round victory over the New York Knicks. They would not win another playoff series until 2016. 

For the first time since 1991, the Knicks failed to win a first-round playoff series. Coincidentally, this also marked the first time since 1996 that the Heat and the Knicks did not meet in the playoffs as both teams were eliminated in the first round by the Charlotte Hornets and the Toronto Raptors, respectively. The Heat and the Knicks would not return to the playoffs until 2004.

2001 also marked the closest the Charlotte Hornets came to making the Eastern Conference Finals, taking a 3-2 series lead over the Milwaukee Bucks before bowing out in seven games. After eliminating the Hornets, the Milwaukee Bucks made the Eastern Conference Finals for the first time since 1986. For the Bucks, this was their most recent playoff series win until 2019.

The Western Conference Semi-Finals series between the San Antonio Spurs and Dallas Mavericks also marked the start of the Mavericks-Spurs rivalry. The Spurs would win this playoff series (along with subsequent series victories in 2003 and 2010), while the Mavericks won in 2006 and 2009. Game 4 of the Spurs-Mavericks series was the last NBA game ever played at Reunion Arena, as the Mavericks moved to the American Airlines Center the following season.

With their Western Conference Finals sweep of the San Antonio Spurs, the Lakers went 11-0 through the first three rounds, extending their winning streak to 19 games (regular season and playoffs)). The Lakers also equaled the previous records set by their 1989 team by winning their first 11 post-season games and sweeping three series in the post-season. Their playoff dominance would be bested after the first round of playoffs was extended to a best of seven format instead of the best of five in the 2003 NBA playoffs by the 2016-17 Golden State Warriors who would go 16-1 on their way to their fifth championship.

With their Eastern Conference Finals victory over the Milwaukee Bucks, the Philadelphia 76ers made the NBA Finals for the first time since 1983, when Moses Malone and Julius Erving led the 1983 team to the NBA title (coincidentally, last defeating the Lakers) in the famous "fo', fo', fo'" year (it ended up being "fo', fi', fo'", as Philadelphia lost one second-round game to the Milwaukee Bucks that year). With the loss, the Bucks would not return to the Conference Finals until 2019.

Game 1 of the 2001 NBA Finals was extremely notable for two things.
 Allen Iverson’s step over Tyrone Lue
 The Philadelphia 76ers giving the Lakers their only loss of the postseason (107-101 in Overtime).

With their Game 5 win over the Philadelphia 76ers, the Los Angeles Lakers won their 13th NBA championship. With the win, the Lakers put together the most dominant postseason in NBA history, going 15–1. They set many records, including going undefeated in regulation and on the road (finishing 8–0 in the latter category). They were also the second NBA champion to defeat four 50-win or better teams on their way to the title as the Rockets did it first in 1995.

Bracket

Playoff qualifying

Western Conference

Best record in NBA
The San Antonio Spurs clinched the best record in the NBA, and earned home court advantage throughout the entire playoffs. However, when they lost to the Los Angeles Lakers in the Western Conference Finals, the Lakers gained home court advantage for the NBA Finals. San Antonio's 58 games remains the lowest for a team with home court advantage throughout the playoffs, being 3 games fewer than the Pacers and Cavs' 61 in 2004 and 2010, respectively.

Clinched a playoff berth
The following teams clinched a playoff berth in the West:

San Antonio Spurs (58-24, clinched Midwest division)
Los Angeles Lakers (56-26, clinched Pacific division)
Sacramento Kings (55-27)
Utah Jazz (53-29)
Dallas Mavericks (53-29)
Phoenix Suns (51-31)
Portland Trail Blazers (50-32)
Minnesota Timberwolves (47-35)

Eastern Conference

Best record in conference 
The Philadelphia 76ers clinched the best record in the Eastern Conference, and had home court advantage throughout the Eastern Conference playoffs.

Clinched a playoff berth
The following teams clinched a playoff berth in the East:

Philadelphia 76ers (56-26, clinched Atlantic division)
Milwaukee Bucks (52-30, clinched Central division)
Miami Heat (50-32)
New York Knicks (48-34)
Toronto Raptors (47-35)
Charlotte Hornets (46-36)
Orlando Magic (43-39)
Indiana Pacers (41-41)

First round
''Note: Times are EDT (UTC−4) as listed by NBA.

Eastern Conference first round

(1) Philadelphia 76ers vs. (8) Indiana Pacers

In Game 1, Reggie Miller hit the game-winning 3 with 2.9 seconds left.

This was the fourth playoff meeting between these two teams, with the Pacers winning two of the first three meetings.

(2) Milwaukee Bucks vs. (7) Orlando Magic

In Game 3, Ray Allen sends the game to overtime with a dunk over Tracy McGrady with 3.5 seconds left.

This was the first playoff meeting between the Bucks and the Magic.

(3) Miami Heat vs. (6) Charlotte Hornets

This was the first playoff meeting between the Heat and the Charlotte Hornets/Bobcats franchise.

(4) New York Knicks vs. (5) Toronto Raptors

This was the second playoff meeting between these two teams, with the Knicks winning the first meeting.

Western Conference first round

(1) San Antonio Spurs vs. (8) Minnesota Timberwolves

This was the second playoff meeting between these two teams, with the Spurs winning the first meeting.

(2) Los Angeles Lakers vs. (7) Portland Trail Blazers

This was the tenth playoff meeting between these two teams, with the Lakers winning seven of the first nine meetings.

(3) Sacramento Kings vs. (6) Phoenix Suns

This was the fourth playoff meeting between these two teams, with the Suns winning two of the first three meetings.

(4) Utah Jazz vs. (5) Dallas Mavericks

In Game 5, Calvin Booth made the series winning layup with 9.6 seconds left. The Mavs would then not only become the 8th team in playoff history to overcome an 0–2 deficit, but also win their first playoff series since 1988.

This was the second playoff meeting between these two teams, with the Mavericks winning the first meeting.

Conference semifinals

Eastern Conference semifinals

(1) Philadelphia 76ers vs. (5) Toronto Raptors

76ers ended a 16-year drought by advancing to the conference finals when Vince Carter's long jumper at the buzzer bounced off the rim.

This was the first playoff meeting between the 76ers and the Raptors.

(2) Milwaukee Bucks vs. (6) Charlotte Hornets

This was the first playoff meeting between the Hornets and the Bucks.

Western Conference semifinals

(1) San Antonio Spurs vs. (5) Dallas Mavericks

This was the first playoff meeting between the Mavericks and the Spurs.

(2) Los Angeles Lakers vs. (3) Sacramento Kings

This was the ninth playoff meeting between these two teams, with the Lakers winning seven of the first eight meetings.

Conference finals

Eastern Conference finals

(1) Philadelphia 76ers vs. (2) Milwaukee Bucks

This was the ninth playoff meeting between these two teams, with the 76ers winning five of the first eight meetings.

Western Conference finals

(1) San Antonio Spurs vs. (2) Los Angeles Lakers

This was the seventh playoff meeting between these two teams, with the Lakers winning four of the first six meetings.

NBA Finals: (W2) Los Angeles Lakers vs. (E1) Philadelphia 76ers

In Game 1, Allen Iverson scored 48 points in his first-ever Finals game as the 76ers ended Lakers' 11-game playoff winning streak (19 overall) and ended the Lakers' perfect playoff run that season.

This was the sixth playoff meeting between these two teams, with the Lakers winning four of the first five meetings.

References

External links
NBA.com's 2001 Playoffs coverage

National Basketball Association playoffs
Playoffs
Sports in Portland, Oregon

fi:NBA-kausi 2000–2001#Pudotuspelit